Montserrat Pujol Joval (born 27 April 1979 in Andorra la Vella) is a former track and field athlete who competed internationally for Andorra.

Pujol represented Andorra at the 2008 Summer Olympics in Beijing. She competed at the 100 metres sprint and placed seventh in her heat without advancing to the second round. She ran the distance in a time of 12.73 seconds.

Major competitions record

Notes

References

External links
 
 
 

1979 births
Living people
Andorran female sprinters
Andorran female long jumpers
Andorran female triple jumpers
Olympic athletes of Andorra
Athletes (track and field) at the 2008 Summer Olympics
Mediterranean Games competitors for Andorra
Athletes (track and field) at the 2001 Mediterranean Games